The Music Network is an Australian magazine launched in 1994 by John Woodruff. In 2017, it was acquired by Jake Challenor, who serves as its publisher and editor.

History 
The Music Network was founded by John Woodruff in 1994, initially as a paper-based publication for the Australian music industry. This included record labels, media networks, music and DVD retailers, radio and television programmers and music directors, sales representatives, artist managers, music publishers and concert promoters. In January 2009, the magazine was sold to the music marketing and publishing group Peer Group Media, which is under the ownership of Adam Zammit, who replaced Woodruff as the new owner of The Music Network. In March 2009, former Future Entertainment general manager Jade Harley, became the magazine's new managing editor. The Music Network'''s website re-launched on 8 June 2009, with a new design, logo and layout.

 Content The Music Network is issued weekly and features the latest music news, radio airplay charts and statistics, music sales data for both physical and digital releases, tour and live event information, interviews with local and international artists, as well as information on new singles released to Australian radio, retail and other media outlets. It also publishes the TopSwaps chart which monitors the number of songs downloaded from file-sharing sites each week.

Country Hot 50The Music Network'' operates the "TMN Country Hot 50" chart in co-operation with Radio Monitor. The chart includes airplay data and runs Friday to Thursday, with a new chart published every Friday morning. The chart replaced the previous "TMN Country Airplay Chart", and is "the most comprehensive country airplay chart in the history of Australian radio".

References

External links
 

1994 establishments in Australia
Listings magazines
Magazines established in 1994
Mass media in New South Wales
Music magazines published in Australia
Weekly magazines published in Australia